John Giles was elected August 13, 1829 to the term beginning March 4, 1829, but resigned from the seat without having served.

A special election was held December 2, 1829 to finish the term. Abraham Rencher (Jacksonian) won the election, defeated the previous incumbent, John Long, and was seated December 7, 1829 for the beginning of the 21st United States Congress.

References

See also 
 1828 and 1829 United States House of Representatives elections
 List of United States representatives from North Carolina

North Carolina 1829 10
North Carolina 1829 10
1829 10
North Carolina 10
United States House of Representatives 10
United States House of Representatives 1829 10